Pericoli is an Italian surname. Notable people with the surname include:

Emilio Pericoli (1928–2013), Italian singer
Lea Pericoli (born 1935), Italian tennis player, television presenter, and journalist

Italian-language surnames
Surnames of Italian origin